Steven Theodore Alexakos (born December 15, 1946) is a former American football player.

Early years
Steven Alexakos was born on December 15, 1946 in Lowell, Massachusetts.

Alexakos attended Las Lomas High School in Walnut Creek, California.

College years
After high school, Steve attended Junior College at Diablo Valley College from 1965-1966.  He then went on to  Arizona State University and finally to San Jose State where he played Offensive Guard from 1967-1968.

Professional career
Listed at 6'-2" and 250 lbs, Alexakos was drafted in the 9th round by the 1969 Boston Patriots, but played offensive guard for the 1970 Denver Broncos and the 1971 New York Giants

1970, wearing No. 68, Alexakos started one game and played in 8 total during Denver's 1970 season.
1971, wearing No. 60, Alexakos played in 10 games with the Giants.

Later years
In 1991 was working as the Junior varsity line coach at De La Salle High School (Concord, California) when he was moved up to the Varsity Staff.  Here, he was instrumental as part of the coaching staff that established the Spartans longest winning streak of 151 games.  Then in 1995, Steve took a job as line coach for one year at San Jose State.

References:

 Book: "When The Game Stands Tall: the story of the De La Salle Spartans and Football's Longest Winning Streak" By Neil Hayes, Bob Larson, Tony La Russa, 2003.

References

1946 births
Living people
Players of American football from Massachusetts
American football offensive guards
Arizona State Sun Devils football players
San Jose State Spartans football players
Denver Broncos players
New York Giants players
Sportspeople from Lowell, Massachusetts
Sportspeople from Walnut Creek, California